Peyrieraselus relictus is a species of beetle in the family Carabidae, the only species in the genus Peyrieraselus.

References

Pterostichinae